Yên Sơn is a rural district of Tuyên Quang province, in the Northeast region of Vietnam. As of 2003 the district had a population of 175,917. The district covers an area of 1210 km². The district capital lies at Tân Bình.

Administrative divisions
Tân Bình, Đội Bình, Nhữ Khê, Nhữ Hán, Mỹ Bằng, Phú Lâm, Kim Phú, Hoàng Khai, Chân Sơn, Trung Môn, Lang Quán, Thắng Quân, Tứ Quận, Phúc Ninh, Chiêu Yên, Lực Hành, Quý Quân, Xuân Vân, Tân Long, Tân Tiến, Trung Trực, Kiến Thiết, Đạo Viện, Phú Thịnh, Thái Bình, Tiến Bộ, Công Đa, Kim Quan, Trung Sơn, Hùng Lợi, Trung Minh.

References

Districts of Tuyên Quang province
Tuyên Quang province